The Sonata in F major, Op. 12, is a piano sonata in three movements by Jean Sibelius, completed in 1893.

It was first performed by Oskar Merikanto in Helsinki on 17 April 1895. Ilmari Hannikainen, a prominent Finnish composer, said "the F major Piano sonata... a splendid work. Fresh, refreshing and full of life. … I have sometimes heard people mention the orchestral tone of the sonata (the left-hand tremolos) … In my opinion the sonata shows Sibelian piano style at its most genuine. There is no question of there being any tremolos in it. Everything that looks like that is really to be played in quavers or semi-quavers, in the manner of, say, Beethoven's piano sonatas. … When it is well and carefully rehearsed - and performed - the F major sonata is truly a virtuoso piece."

Movements 
Allegro
Andantino
Vivacissimo

References

External links 
 

Sibelius
1893 compositions
Compositions by Jean Sibelius
Compositions in F major